The People's Garden is a community garden established by Hernan Pagan in the Bushwick neighborhood of Brooklyn, New York City, United States. It is located on Broadway between Van Buren Street and Bushwick Avenue.

History
This garden started as the Green Avenue Block Association Garden, but was later renamed the People’s Garden. Known for its salsa dance parties and many other community events, the space is a gathering place created for and by the community.

See also 

 Community Gardens in New York City
 Community gardening in the United States

External links
 https://bqlt.org/garden/the-peoples-garden

References

Community gardening in New York City
Bushwick, Brooklyn